Lipovník is a village and municipality in the Rožňava District in the Košice Region of middle-eastern Slovakia.

History
In historical records the village was first mentioned in 1364.

Geography
The village lies at an altitude of 364 metres and covers an area of 12.723 km².
It has a population of about 520 people.

Culture
The village has a public library and a football pitch.

External links
 Lipovník
https://web.archive.org/web/20080111223415/http://www.statistics.sk/mosmis/eng/run.html

Villages and municipalities in Rožňava District